Ashtat Yeztayar was an Iranian military officer under the Sasanian king Khosrow II (r. 590–628).

Ashtat is first mentioned 606/7 as being appointed as the leader of the Sasanian invasion of Armenia, thus succeeding the previous Sasanian commander of Armenia, Senitam Khusro. During his invasion of Armenia, he is said to have had the son of the former Byzantine emperor Maurice, Theodosius, as his companion (or one pretending to be him). Ashtat soon managed to rout a Byzantine army at Phasiane and then harassed them as far as Satala. 

He then marched towards Theodosiopolis, and managed to make the city surrender by showing them Theodosius. He then seized several Armenian cities such as Citharizum, Satala, Nicopolis and Apastiay. After that, Ashtat Yeztayar disappears from mention in sources. He was shortly succeeded by Shahin Vahmanzadegan in 607/8.

Notes

Sources

Year of death unknown
People of the Byzantine–Sasanian War of 602–628
7th-century Iranian people
Year of birth unknown
Generals of Khosrow II
7th century in Armenia